Macedonia competed at the 2014 Winter Olympics in Sochi, Russia from the 7 to 23 February 2014. The Macedonian team consisted of three athletes in two sports.

Alpine skiing 

According to the final quota allocation released on January 20, 2014, Macedonia had one athlete in qualification position.

Cross-country skiing 

According to the final quota allocation released on January 20, 2014, Macedonia had two athletes in qualification position. Damjanovski finished the men's classical race in 81st position out of 92 athletes, besting his performance from four years prior (where he finished 85th). Meanwhile, 16-year-old Kolaroska finished in 74th out of 76 competitors in her Olympic debut. Damjanovski also took part in the sprint competition and failed to make it out of the qualification round.

Distance

Sprint

References

External links 
Macedonia at the 2014 Winter Olympics

Nations at the 2014 Winter Olympics
2014
Winter Olympics